Sredny Saydys (Orto Saydıs) is a rural locality (a selo) in Kyzyl-Ozyokskoye Rural Settlement of Mayminsky District, the Altai Republic, Russia. The population was 203 as of 2016. There are 5 streets.

Geography 
Sredny Saydys is located on the Saydys River, 43 km southeast of Mayma (the district's administrative centre) by road. Alexandrovka is the nearest rural locality.

References 

Rural localities in Mayminsky District